In video games using procedural world generation, the map seed is a (relatively) short number or text string which is used to procedurally create the game world ("map"). This means that while the seed-unique generated map may be many megabytes in size (often generated incrementally and virtually unlimited in potential size), it is possible to reset to the unmodified map, or the unmodified map can be exchanged between players, just by specifying the map seed. An example of a map seed in Minecraft is "-2242547518357798464". Map seeds are a type of random seeds.

Games which use procedural generation and include support for setting the map seed include Ark: Survival Evolved, Minecraft, Factorio, SCP – Containment Breach, and the desktop version of Terraria. For Minecraft especially, there are websites and articles, dedicated to sharing seeds which have been found to generate interesting maps.

The map seed only has meaning in the context of the algorithm used to generate the map (that algorithm is often, based on Perlin noise). So if the map generation algorithm changes, the map generated by a given seed will also change. Such changes are particularly obvious in Minecraft, where they are handled (or rather, not handled) by simply generating any newly explored chunks of an existing map using the new algorithm, leading to obvious and jarring discontinuities after upgrading.

Favorable seeds can be used when speedrunning video games by specifying the map seed manually.

References

Procedural generation